Music Is My Life is the seventh studio album by Billy Preston, released in 1972. The album contains Preston's first number 1 single, "Will It Go Round in Circles", and a cover of the Beatles' song "Blackbird".  It is also the first of his albums to feature his future A&M Records label-mates the Brothers Johnson. Another track, "God Loves You", was issued on a single as the B-side of "Slaughter", Preston's theme song for the 1972 film of the same name.

Track listing 
All songs by Billy Preston, except where noted.

Side one
 "We're Gonna Make It" – 3:13
 "One Time or Another" (Preston, Robert Sam) – 2:49
 "Blackbird" (John Lennon, Paul McCartney) – 2:48
 "I Wonder Why" (Preston, George Johnson) – 5:43
 "Will It Go Round in Circles" (Preston, Bruce Fisher) – 4:28
 "Ain't That Nothin'" (Preston, Joe Greene, Sam) – 3:47

Side two
 "God Loves You" (Preston, John Schuler) – 2:50
 "Make the Devil Mad (Turn on to Jesus)" – 5:22
 "Nigger Charlie" (Preston, Greene) – 6:31
 "Heart Full of Sorrow" (Preston, Johnson) – 3:35
 "Music Is My Life" – 3:58

Personnel 

 Billy Preston - keyboards, bass guitar, vocals
 George Johnson - guitar
 Louis Johnson - bass guitar
 Hubert Heard - keyboards
 Manuel Kellough - drums
 Tom Scott - horn
 Jim Horn - horn
 George Bohanon - horn
 Buck Monari - horn
 Paul Hubinon - horn
The Campbell-Kurban String Section - strings
 Clarence McDonald, David T. Walker - arrangements
Technical
Roland Young - art direction
Jim McCrary - photography

Notes 

1972 albums
Billy Preston albums
Albums produced by Billy Preston
A&M Records albums